Hoorn Kersenboogerd is a suburban railway station, in the Kersenboogerd district in Hoorn, Netherlands. The station opened on 29 May 1983, and is on the Zaandam–Enkhuizen railway. About 1 km east of the station is a siding where the "stoptrein" (all-station service) to and from to Hoofddorp can be turned around. From this point the line to Enkhuizen becomes single track. The station is located in the east of Hoorn, and was originally referred to in the plans as Hoorn Oost.

Train services
The following services currently call at Hoorn Kersenboogerd:
2x per hour intercity service Enkhuizen - Hoorn – Amsterdam Centraal – Utrecht Centraal – 's-Hertogenbosch – Eindhoven – Heerlen / Roermond – Maastricht
2x per hour local service (sprinter) Leiden Centraal - Schiphol Airport - Zaandam - Hoorn Kersenboogerd

Bus services

References

Railway stations in North Holland
Kersenboogerd Station
Railway stations opened in 1986